Frederick Harold Picketts (April 22, 1909 — April 13, 2002) was a Canadian professional ice hockey player who played 48 games in the National Hockey League with the New York Americans during the 1933–34 season. The rest of his career, which lasted from 1927 to 1941, was spent in various minor leagues. Picketts was born in Asquith, Saskatchewan and died at a nursing home in Saskatoon, Saskatchewan in 2002.

Career statistics

Regular season and playoffs

References

External links
 

1909 births
2002 deaths
Bronx Tigers players
Buffalo Bisons (IHL) players
Canadian ice hockey right wingers
London Tecumsehs players
New Haven Eagles players
New York Americans players
People from Asquith, Saskatchewan
Rochester Cardinals players
Spokane Clippers players
Canadian expatriate ice hockey players in the United States